Naresh Saini  is an Indian politician and is a member of the 17th Legislative Assembly of Uttar Pradesh of India. Saini represents the Behat constituency of Uttar Pradesh. He won over Indian National Congress ticket.

Early life and education
Naresh Saini was born in Mubarikpur, a small village near Gangoh in the state of Uttar Pradesh. He has earned M.A. in political science from Meerut University. Saini is an agriculturist by profession.

Political career
Naresh Saini joined INC in 2012 with Imran Masood. Naresh contested 16th Legislative Assembly of Uttar Pradesh election from Behat but lost to Mahaveer Rana by a narrow margin of 514 votes, but in 2017 Uttar pradesh Assembly election, Saini won Behat assembly with a margin of more than 25000 votes and became MLA. His wife Usha has also served as Zila panchayat member in Saharanpur district. He joined BJP on 12 January 2022 ahead of 2022 assembly election.

Posts Held

See also

Behat (Assembly constituency)
Uttar Pradesh Legislative Assembly
Indian National Congress
Imran Masood

References

Indian National Congress politicians
Uttar Pradesh MLAs 2017–2022
People from Saharanpur district
1964 births
Living people
Bharatiya Janata Party politicians from Uttar Pradesh
Indian National Congress politicians from Uttar Pradesh